Arthur "Art" Barnard (March 10, 1929 – May 1, 2018) was an American sprinter. He competed mainly in the 110 m hurdles event, winning a bronze medal at the 1952 Olympics. Barnard attended the University of Southern California. Running for La Jolla High School, he finished second in the 120 yard high hurdles at the 1947 CIF California State Meet.

Masters Track and Field
Barnard continued to compete into the newly emerging Masters division.  In July 1970 Barnard (age 41) competed in the 120 yard high hurdles (36" tall) at the 3rd Annual Masters National Outdoor Track and Field Championship in San Diego, California winning in 15.1.  Barnard's 15.1 represented a Masters American Record at the time.

References

1929 births
2018 deaths
American male hurdlers
Olympic bronze medalists for the United States in track and field
Athletes (track and field) at the 1952 Summer Olympics
University of Southern California alumni
Medalists at the 1952 Summer Olympics
American masters athletes
Track and field athletes from Seattle